The fifth Herrera government was a regional government of Castile and León led by President Juan Vicente Herrera. It was formed in July 2015 after the regional election and ended in July 2019 following the regional election.

Government

References

2015 establishments in Castile and León
2019 disestablishments in Castile and León
Cabinets established in 2015
Cabinets disestablished in 2019
Cabinets of Castile and León